The Doctors Blackwell: How Two Pioneering Sisters Brought Medicine to Women and Women to Medicine is a 2021 book by Janice P. Nimura that examines Elizabeth and Emily Blackwell. The book has eight "positive" reviews, eleven "rave" reviews, and one "mixed" review, according to review aggregator Book Marks.

Reception

References

External links
 
 
  (The conversation between Perri Klass and Janice Nimura begins at 18:06 of 56:07 in video.)
 

2021 non-fiction books
English-language books
W. W. Norton & Company books